Jane A. Gordon (born June 9, 1956 or June 9, 1957) is an American jewelry designer based in New York City.

Early life
Gordon was born June 9, 1957 to Tammy and Leonard Gordon. Gordon grew up in the Mainline area of Philadelphia. She was trained from an early age to question everything, in a home and schools without rules. She graduated from the Miquon Upper School in 1975 and New York University in 1978 with a BA in Dramatic Literature, Comparative Religion and Experimental Psychology. She was invited to apply to NYU by the Stella Adler Studio of Acting.

Gordon lived in London for 6 years after graduating from NYU, where she worked for Bernard Cornfeld and First Composers Company, owned by Freddy Bienstock. She frequented the members only nightclub, Tramp, where she met and dated celebrities and royalty including Robert De Niro, Mel Brooks, Ian La Frenais, Dodi Fayed and Gary Osborne.

Gordon worked for 15 years as a commercial real-estate broker in New York City and was later employed as a sales manager and corporate gifts coordinator for an Internet-based luxury goods purveyor LuxuryFinder.com. When the site shut down and she was laid off, she decided to go into the corporate gifts business on her own, setting up a company called WishBrokers.com.  Soon after Gordon accidentally started designing jewelry, and found herself combining philosophy, perspective and art to create jewelry which would be worn for beauty, and cherished for the layers of discovery in the metaphorical pieces.

Jane A Gordon Jewelry
Gordon's jewelry has been carried by retail venues including Saks Fifth Avenue, Fortunoff, Crystal Cruises, Holland America Line, Royal Caribbean Cruises, Ltd., Azamara Club Cruises, Celebrity Cruises, and Costa Cruises. She is now selling on line at www.JaneGordon.com while also using technology and other venues to collaborate with end users, allowing them to adapt her art and photography to suit themselves.

Gordon recently designed a logo for the Palm Beach Club with a line of jewelry to go with it in gold, silver and diamonds and is working on expanding this concept of bundling a company’s logo with a line of jewelry.

Her work often represents specific themes or messages. Her “Palm Beach” line features a gold bowl with diamonds tumbling out of it, signifying abundance, she says.

In 2008, Gordon was featured in Lustre Magazine's "Who's Who in Designer Jewelry."

In 2013, Gordon was quoted by Instore Magazine about pearls.

References

External links
Official website
www.JaneGordon.com

YouTube Channel
 https://www.youtube.com/user/JaneAGordonDesigns

Instagram
  https://www.instagram.com/jane_a_gordon/

Amazon Books
 https://www.amazon.com/Designs-Life-Uncommon-Happiness-Leadership/dp/1514690675

1950s births
Living people
American jewelry designers
New York University alumni
Women jewellers